Zagreb is OURS! is a municipalist green left political party from Zagreb, Croatia. After winning first seats in 2017 elections for the Zagreb Assembly and profiling itself as the most vocal opposition to the mayor Milan Bandić and his local majority coalition, the platform took part in the 2019 EU elections, as well as the 2020 Croatian parliamentary election within green-left platform We can!.

History 
Much of the pre-history of the platform is around local civic activism and movement of Right to the city as "Pravo na grad". The political turn was made significant with escalation of protests and smaller green parties joining forces with activists. In April 2017, the Platform formed a coalition with four left and green parties in Zagreb, creating for the first time an alliance of progressive political organizations in Zagreb. In their very first municipal elections held in Zagreb in May 2017, the coalition won 7,6 % of votes (4 seats) in Zagreb City Assembly, 21 seats in city districts and also 41 seats in local councils, with many of the elected representatives being young persons who have previously not been engaged in institutional politics."

The most prominent figures in the platform are current members of Croatian parliament: Tomislav Tomašević, Sandra Benčić, Vilim Matula, with Mima Simić first Croatian out LGBTIQ+ political candidate, Urša Neda Raukar-Gamulin (prominent actor), Danijela Dolenec (academic) and Teodor Celakoski (cultural worker).

Platform
The platform describes itself as very diverse, "formed in February 2017 by citizens from all walks of life (activists, cultural workers, trade unionists, social entrepreneurs etc., many of whom have been previously active for years in social movements in Zagreb) and different from existing parties in aiming to build a "new politics based on the principles of wide participation, inclusiveness and openness".

The party further expanded its visibility on national level by establishing We can! / Možemo! as a national political platform (including similar grass-root and movement based initiatives) for the 2019 EU elections. For the 2020 Croatian parliamentary elections, the party and Možemo! presented a joint program and lists of candidates including other coalition partners (New Left, Sustainable Development of Croatia, Workers' Front and For the City).

See also
Green–Left Coalition in Croatia

External links 

 Joint program with Možemo!
 Joint list of candidates with Možemo

References

2017 establishments in Croatia
Anti-fascism in Croatia
Anti-fascist organizations
Ecosocialist parties
Green political parties in Croatia
Left-wing activism
Left-wing parties
Political parties established in 2017
Political parties in Croatia
Socialist parties in Croatia